The 2018–19 daytime network television schedule for four of the five major English-language commercial broadcast networks in the United States covers the daytime hours from September 2018 to August 2019. The schedule is followed by a list per network of returning series, and any series canceled after the 2017–18 season.

Affiliates fill time periods not occupied by network programs with local or syndicated programming. PBS – which offers daytime programming through a children's program block, PBS Kids – is not included, as its member television stations have local flexibility over most of their schedules and broadcast times for network shows may vary. Fox does not offer daytime network programming nor network news on weekdays; as such, schedules are only included for Saturdays and Sundays. Also not included are MyNetworkTV (as the programming service also does not offer daytime programs of any kind), and Ion Television (as its schedule is composed mainly of syndicated reruns).

Legend

 New series are highlighted in bold.

Schedule
 All times correspond to U.S. Eastern and Pacific Time scheduling (except for some live sports or events). Except where affiliates slot certain programs outside their network-dictated timeslots, subtract one hour for Central, Mountain, Alaska, and Hawaii-Aleutian times.
 Local schedules may differ, as affiliates have the option to pre-empt or delay network programs. Such scheduling may be limited to preemptions caused by local or national breaking news or weather coverage (which may force stations to tape delay certain programs in overnight timeslots or defer them to a co-operated station or digital subchannel in their regular timeslot) and any major sports events scheduled to air in a weekday timeslot (mainly during major holidays). Stations may air shows at other times at their preference.

Monday–Friday

Notes:
 CBS owned-and-operated and affiliate stations have the option of airing Let's Make a Deal at either 10:00 a.m. or 3:00 p.m. Eastern, depending on the station's choice of feed.
 (*) The fourth hour of Today was renamed Today with Hoda & Jenna on April 8, 2019, when Jenna Bush Hager succeeded Kathie Lee Gifford as co-host of the program, alongside Hoda Kotb. While Today with Kathie Lee & Hoda/Today with Hoda & Jenna is part of Today, it is promoted as its own distinct program.
 (†) Beginning October 30, in the wake of the abrupt cancellation of Megyn Kelly Today, NBC reformatted the 9:00 a.m. Eastern hour of Today to feature anchors from the main broadcast hosting the third hour – which like Kelly's program is promoted as its own distinct entity – under the "Third Hour" titling.
  (**) GMA Day was renamed Strahan and Sara on January 28, 2019, a decision made to partially downplay its ties to parent series Good Morning America by placing a larger emphasis on its hosts (relegating references to GMA  to the program's title logo).

Saturday

Sunday

Notes:
 (‡) ABC and Fox do not handle programming responsibilities for their programming blocks, but offers syndicated blocks of E/I-compliant programming that are intended for exclusive distribution to their stations. Litton's Weekend Adventure is offered to ABC stations by arrangement with Litton Entertainment and Xploration Station is offered to Fox stations by arrangement with Steve Rotfeld Productions.
 To comply with FCC educational programming regulations, stations may defer certain programs featured in their respective network's E/I program blocks to determined weekend late morning or afternoon time periods if a sporting event is not scheduled in the timeslot or in place of paid programming that would otherwise be scheduled.
 Airtimes of sporting events may vary depending on the offerings scheduled for that weekend. Scheduling overruns may occur due to events going into overtime, weather delays or other game stoppages, preempting scheduled local or syndicated programming.

By network

ABC

Returning series:
ABC World News Tonight
America This Morning
ESPN on ABC
ESPN College Football on ABC
General Hospital
Good Morning America
Litton's Weekend Adventure‡
Jack Hanna's Wild Countdown
Ocean Treks with Jeff Corwin
Rock the Park
Vacation Creation
Strahan and Sara
This Week
The View

New series:
GMA Day 
Litton's Weekend Adventure‡
Hearts of Heroes 
The Great Dr. Scott

Not returning from 2017–18:
The Chew
Litton's Weekend Adventure‡
Sea Rescue
The Wildlife Docs

CBS

Returning series:
The Bold and the Beautiful
CBS Dream Team
Dr. Chris: Pet Vet
The Henry Ford's Innovation Nation with Mo Rocca
The Inspectors
Lucky Dog
Pet Vet Dream Team
CBS Sports
 College Football on CBS / SEC on CBS
 NFL on CBS
The NFL Today
CBS Evening News
CBS Morning News
CBS News Sunday Morning
CBS This Morning
CBS This Morning Saturday
Face the Nation
Let's Make a Deal
The Price is Right
The Talk
The Young and the Restless

New series:
CBS Dream Team
Hope in the Wild
Tails of Valor

Not returning from 2017–18:
CBS Dream Team
The Open Road with Dr. Chris

Fox

Returning series:
Fox News Sunday
Fox Sports
Fox College Football
Fox NFL Kickoff
Fox NFL Sunday
Weekend Marketplace
Xploration Station‡
Xploration Awesome Planet
Xploration DIY Sci
Xploration Earth 2050
Xploration Nature Knows Best
Xploration Outer Space
Xploration Weird But True

The CW

Returning series:
One Magnificent Morning
Chicken Soup for the Soul's Hidden Heroes
This Old House: Trade School
The Wildlife Docs

New series:
The Jerry Springer Show 
One Magnificent Morning
Chicken Soup for the Soul's Animal Tales
Did I Mention Invention? with Alie Ward
Ready, Set, Pet
Welcome Home

Not returning from 2017–18:
One Magnificent Morning
Brain Games: Family Edition
Dog Whisperer with Cesar Milan: Family Edition
The Robert Irvine Show

NBC

Returning series:
Days of Our Lives
Megyn Kelly Today
The More You Know
The Champion Within with Lauren Thompson
Naturally, Danny Seo
Vets Saving Pets
The Voyager with Josh Garcia
NBC Nightly News
Today
Today with Kathie Lee & Hoda

New series:
Today Third Hour
The More You Know
Consumer 101
Earth Odyssey with Dylan Dreyer

Not returning from 2017–18:
The More You Know
Give
Health + Happiness with Mayo Clinic
Journey with Dylan Dreyer
Wilderness Vet

Renewals and cancellations

Series renewals

CBS
 The Bold and the Beautiful—Renewed for a 32nd season on August 9, 2018.
 Let's Make a Deal—Renewed for an eleventh season on August 9, 2018.
 The Price is Right—Renewed for a 48th and 49th season on June 20, 2017.
 The Talk—Renewed for a tenth season on August 9, 2018.
 The Young and the Restless—Renewed for three additional seasons (encompassing its 44th, 45th and 46th seasons) on June 20, 2017.

NBC
 Days of Our Lives—Renewed for a 54th season (running through September 2019) on March 8, 2018.

Cancellations/series endings

NBC
 Megyn Kelly Today—Cancelled on October 26, 2018, four days after Megyn Kelly, in a panel segment on the appropriateness of blackface in Halloween costumes, made comments that were widely criticized as a defense of the historically racially insensitive practice.

See also
2018–19 United States network television schedule (prime-time)
2018–19 United States network television schedule (late night)

References

Sources
 
 
 

United States weekday network television schedules
2018 in American television
2019 in American television